Thomas Raymond Potter (4 June 1925 – 23 February 2000) was an Australian rules footballer who played for Richmond in the Victorian Football League (VFL) during the 1940s.

Potter shared his league debut with Don Fraser in the opening round of the 1945 VFL season, when Richmond took on Footscray at Punt Road. He kicked two goals to help his club win by 10 points. Potter didn't appear again until early in the 1947 season when Richmond lost to Melbourne.

The forward had more success in the Victorian Football Association, kicking 84 goals for Preston in 1948 to become the first player from the club to win the VFA Leading Goal-kicker award.

References

External links

Ray Potter's playing statistics from The VFA Project

1925 births
Richmond Football Club players
Preston Football Club (VFA) players
Stawell Football Club players
Australian rules footballers from Victoria (Australia)
2000 deaths